Santanu Paul is an entrepreneur, technocrat and opinion writer. He is the founder and CEO of TalentSprint, a global edtech company that offers transformational deeptech learning programs for new-age professionals.

Early life and education

Paul received his B. Tech from IIT Madras and his Ph.D. from the University of Michigan, Ann Arbor, both in Computer Science. His academic record over time earned him the Rackham Doctoral Fellowship, the IBM Canada Fellowship, the LaCroute Fellowship, and the National Talent Scholarship.

Career
From 2003-2008, Paul worked for Virtusa Corporation as Senior Vice President for Global Delivery Operations and Head of Indian Operations, and was part of the global leadership team when the company went public on NASDAQ in 2007. From 1999-2003, Santanu worked as Chief Technology Officer at Viveca and OpenPages, both venture-backed technology firms based in Boston. From 1995-1998, he was a Computer Scientist at IBM T.J. Watson Research Center in Yorktown Heights, New York.

Paul co-founded TalentSprint, a for-profit, high-impact platform. He has led the gifted TalentSprint team to fifteen awards as well as multiple venture capital raises from Nexus Venture Partners and the National Skill Development Corporation (NSDC)

He is an author or co-author of twenty international technology papers and two United States patents. He is an Independent Board Director at the National Payments Corporation of India and NSDL Payments Bank. Paul is a conference speaker and panel moderator, and his op-ed pieces and columns appear frequently in media.

On occasion, he teaches entrepreneurship at the Indian Institute of Technology, advises the Indian banking sector on technology trends and talent search, and conducts leadership clinics for corporate leaders. He is a member of the Young Presidents Organization (YPO).

References

Businesspeople from Hyderabad, India
Indian computer scientists
University of Michigan alumni
Ramakrishna Mission schools alumni
Living people
Year of birth missing (living people)